The Frederick Baronetcy, of Burwood House in the County of Surrey, is a title in the Baronetage of Great Britain. It was created on 10 June 1723 for John Frederick of Burwood House in the southern half of Walton-on-Thames which later became Hersham.

He was the grandson of the wealthy merchant Sir John Frederick (b.1601) Lord Mayor of London in 1662 and Member of Parliament for Dartmouth and the City of London, president of Christ's Hospital rebuilding its hall after the Fire of London by expending £5,000 and founding its mathematical school. He died in 1685 leaving £42,000 (£170,000,000 in 2015 money).

In the late 18th century the fourth Baronet represented Shoreham and West Looe in the House of Commons while the fifth Baronet represented Newport (Cornwall), Christchurch and Surrey. The seventh Baronet was High Sheriff of Hampshire in 1889 and the eighth was High Sheriff of Northamptonshire in 1934.

The family seat fell into the female line and was rebuilt circa 1810 to become Burwood Park School on Manor Park Drive as it replaced a manor house.  Its outlying -estate between Walton on Thames railway station (Sir Richard's Bridge) and St George's Hill, Burwood Park, was sold by the sixth baronet's purchaser's daughters in the late 19th century to Edward Guinness, 1st Earl of Iveagh who converted it into the Burwood Park gated residential estate. The current baronet lives in Batcombe, Somerset.

Marescoe Frederick, younger brother of the fourth Baronet, was a major-general in the British Army. His great-great-grandson, John Cromwell Frederick (1920–1974), was a captain in the Royal Navy. Another descendant was the courtier Charles Arthur Frederick.

Succession of Frederick baronetcy, of Burwood House (1723)
John Frederick Lord Mayor (1601–1685) (and was knighted) 
Thomas Frederick (1650–1720) (and was knighted) 
Sir John Frederick, 1st Baronet (1678–1755)
Sir John Frederick, 2nd Baronet (1728–1757)
Sir Thomas Frederick, 3rd Baronet (1731–1770)
Thomas Frederick (1680–1730), Governor of Fort St. David, East Indies (and was knighted)
Sir John Frederick, 4th Baronet, MP, (1708–1783)
Sir John Frederick, 5th Baronet, MP, (1750–1825)
Sir Richard Frederick, 6th Baronet (1780–1873)
Charles Frederick, MP, Surveyor of the Ordnance (1709–1785) (and was knighted)
 Charles Frederick, East India Company, (1748–1791)
 Edward Frederick (1784–1866)
Sir Charles Edward Frederick, 7th Baronet (1843–1913)
Sir Charles Edward St John Frederick, 8th Baronet (1876–1938)
Sir Edward Boscawen Frederick, 9th Baronet (1880–1956)
Sir Charles Boscawen Frederick, 10th Baronet (1919–2001)
Sir Christopher St John Frederick, 11th Baronet (born 1950)

Notes

References
 Burke's Peerage, Baronetage and Knightage, 100th Edn, London, 1953.
Kidd, Charles, Williamson, David (editors). Debrett's Peerage and Baronetage (1990 edition). New York: St Martin's Press, 1990, 

Frederick
1723 establishments in Great Britain